The 2011 Japan Series (known as the Konami  Nippon Series 2011 for sponsorship reasons) was the 62nd edition of Nippon Professional Baseball's championship series. The best-of-seven playoff matched the Chunichi Dragons and Fukuoka SoftBank Hawks, the respective champions of the Central League's and the Pacific League's Climax Series (postseason). The Series began on Saturday, November 12, 2011 and was a rematch of the 1999 Japan Series, which the Hawks won, four games to one.

The Hawks won the series in seven games, claiming their fifth Japan Series crown.

Due to the 2011 Tohoku Earthquake delaying the season opener to April 12, the Japan Series was delayed to mid-November.

Climax Series

Summary

Road to the Series

Fukuoka SoftBank Hawks
After not having won a playoff series since 2003 when they won the Japan Series that year, the Hawks finally broke through against the Saitama Seibu Lions.  Earning a first-round bye and a one-game advantage in the Pacific League Climax Series Final Stage, the Hawks completed the sweep of the Lions to earn their spot in the Japan Series.

During the regular season, the Hawks were the best team in the league record-wise at 88-46-10.  They scored the second-most runs in the league (550) and allowed the fewest (351), while also stealing the most bases and leading the league in team batting average (.267).  Leading the team offensively was new acquisition Seiichi Uchikawa, who led the entire league in batting average at .338.  He was helped by two longtime Hawks mainstays at the top of the lineup, Munenori Kawasaki and Yuichi Honda, who stole 91 bases between them.  Providing the power was Nobuhiro Matsuda, who finally had a breakout season with 25 home runs and 83 runs batted in, both team highs.

In a pitching-heavy year for NPB, the Hawks had a three-headed monster that finished 3-4-5 in ERA.  Tsuyoshi Wada (16-5, 1.51), Toshiya Sugiuchi (8-7, 1.91) and D. J. Houlton (19-6, 2.19) anchored the Hawks rotation, and Houlton had the most wins by a foreigner since Gene Bacque. The bullpen featured another breakout star in Masahiko Morifuku, who led the team in holds with 34 and had a 1.13 ERA to go along with it.  Closing duties were split between regular closer Takahiro Mahara and another stellar foreigner, Brian Falkenborg, who each had 19 saves.

Chunichi Dragons
Chunichi also won the Central League with the best record at 75-59-10, defeating the Tokyo Yakult Swallows 4-2 in the Central League Climax Series.  The Dragons had been to the Japan Series the previous season but fell to the Chiba Lotte Marines in seven games.  This was Chunichi's third Japan Series appearance in the last five years, winning in 2007 against the Hokkaido Nippon-Ham Fighters.

Returning largely the same team as the previous season, the Dragons showcased an excellent pitching staff that covered up for a league-worst offense that only batted .228 as a team.  The offensive leaders were Tony Blanco, who hit 16 home runs during the season while batting .248.  Masahiro Araki led the team in batting average at .263 and also stolen bases with 18.

The pitching staff was led by a stellar foreigner of their own in Maximo Nelson, who may have had a losing record at 10-14 with a 2.52 ERA, but was the only pitcher on the staff who threw 200 innings.  Veteran Kazuki Yoshimi offset this with an 18-3 record and a 1.63 ERA, and Taiwanese lefty Chen Wei-Yin added eight wins of his own.

The bullpen was the real star, though, as it had four relievers who posted ERA's under 2.00.  Takuya Asao led the pack with a nigh-unhittable 0.41 ERA and a 7-2 record while also leading the league in holds with 45 and also getting 10 saves.  Masato Kobayashi also was dominant with a 0.87 ERA and 18 holds in 58 innings, and Yoshihiro Suzuki added 12 holds of his own while also posting a 1.08 ERA.  The anchor in the bullpen was longtime closer Hitoki Iwase, who saved 37 games during the season.

Game summaries

Game 1

Game 2

Game 3

Game 4

Game 5

Game 6

Game 7

See also
2011 Korean Series
2011 World Series

References

Japan Series
Chunichi Dragons
Fukuoka SoftBank Hawks
Japan Series